
Gmina Stary Lubotyń is a rural gmina (administrative district) in Ostrów Mazowiecka County, Masovian Voivodeship, in east-central Poland. Its seat is the village of Stary Lubotyń, which lies approximately 15 kilometres (9 mi) north-east of Ostrów Mazowiecka and 100 km (62 mi) north-east of Warsaw.

Villages
Gmina Stary Lubotyń contains the villages and settlements of Budziszki, Chmielewo, Gawki, Gniazdowo, Grądziki, Gumowo, Klimonty, Kosewo, Koskowo, Lubotyń-Kolonia, Lubotyń-Morgi, Lubotyń-Włóki, Podbiele, Podbielko, Rabędy, Rogówek, Rogowo-Folwark, Rząśnik, Stare Rogowo, Stary Lubotyń, Stary Turobin, Sulęcin Szlachecki, Sulęcin Włościański, Świerże, Turobin-Brzozowa, Żochowo and Żyłowo.

Neighbouring gminas
Gmina Stary Lubotyń is bordered by the gminas of Czerwin, Ostrów Mazowiecka, Śniadowo and Szumowo.

References

Polish official population figures 2006

Stary Lubotyn
Ostrów Mazowiecka County